The Nicholas reaction is an organic reaction where a dicobalt octacarbonyl-stabilized propargylic cation is reacted with a nucleophile.  Oxidative demetallation gives the desired alkylated alkyne.  It is named after Kenneth M. Nicholas.

Several reviews have been published.

Reaction mechanism

The addition of dicobalt octacarbonyl to a propargylic ether (1) gives the dicobalt intermediate 2.  Reaction with HBF4 or Lewis acid gives the key dicobalt octacarbonyl-stabilized propargylic cation (3a and 3b).  Addition of a nucleophile followed by a mild oxidation gives the desired substituted alkyne (5).

The likely intermediates in the reactions, [(propargylium)Co2(CO)6]+ cation 3, possessed considerable stability. It was, in fact, possible to observe these cations by 1H NMR at 10 °C when generated using d-trifluoroacetic acid. Later, Richard E. Connor and Nicholas were able to isolate salts of such cations 3 as stable, dark red solids by treatment of the Co2(CO)6-complexed propargyl alcohols with excess fluoroantimonic acid or tetrafluoroboric acid etherate. The reason that these complexes are so remarkably stable is due to significant delocalization of the cationic charge onto the Co2(CO)6 moiety. Experimental evidence for the charge delocalization shows an increase in the IR absorption frequencies of the C-O ligands present in the cations compared to those in the parent alcohols. Also, when the cation is formed the central carbon is rehybridised from sp3 to sp2 Orbital hybridisation. This causes the atoms to exhibit a trigonal planar arrangement and shortens the covalent bonds around the central carbon in the cation due to the increase in S character.

See also
 Pauson–Khand reaction
 Organometallic chemistry

References

Substitution reactions
Name reactions